Ivan Ivanov (born 19 November 1950) is a Bulgarian volleyball player. He competed in the men's tournament at the 1972 Summer Olympics.

References

External links
 

1950 births
Living people
Bulgarian men's volleyball players
Olympic volleyball players of Bulgaria
Volleyball players at the 1972 Summer Olympics
People from Harmanli
Sportspeople from Haskovo Province